Johan ("John") Waldemar Mattsson (November 5, 1894 – September 1, 1969) was a Swedish track and field athlete who competed in the 1920 Summer Olympics. In 1920 he finished ninth in the pole vault competition.

References

External links
Profile 

1894 births
1969 deaths
Swedish male pole vaulters
Olympic athletes of Sweden
Athletes (track and field) at the 1920 Summer Olympics